The IEEE Alexander Graham Bell Medal is an award honoring "exceptional contributions to communications and networking sciences and engineering" in the field of telecommunications.  The medal is one of the highest honors awarded by the Institute of Electrical and Electronics Engineers (IEEE) for achievements in telecommunication sciences and engineering.

It was instituted in 1976 by the directors of IEEE, commemorating the centennial of the invention of the telephone by Alexander Graham Bell. The award is presented either to an individual, or to a team of two or three persons.

The institute's reasoning for the award was described thus:

Recipients of the award receive a gold medal, bronze replica, certificate, and an honorarium.

Recipients
As listed by the IEEE:

1976 Amos E. Joel, Jr., William Keister, and Raymond W. Ketchledge
1977 Eberhardt Rechtin
1978 M. Robert Aaron, John S. Mayo, and Eric E. Sumner
1979 A. Christian Jacobaeus
1980 Richard R. Hough
1981 David Slepian
1982 Harold A. Rosen
1983 Stephen O. Rice
1984 Andrew J. Viterbi
1985 Charles K. Kao
1986 Bernard Widrow
1987 Joel S. Engel, Richard H. Frenkiel, and William C. Jakes, Jr.
1988 Robert M. Metcalfe
1989 Gerald R. Ash and Billy B. Oliver
1990 Paul Baran
1991 C. Chapin Cutler, John O. Limb, and Arun N. Netravali
1992 James L. Massey
1993 Donald C. Cox
1994 Hiroshi Inose
1995 Irwin M. Jacobs
1996 Tadahiro Sekimoto
1997 Vinton G. Cerf and Robert E. Kahn
1998 Richard E. Blahut
1999 David G. Messerschmitt
2000 Vladimir A. Kotelnikov

2002 Tsuneo Nakahara
2003 Joachim Hagenauer

2005 Jim K. Omura
2006 John Wozencraft
2007 Norman Abramson
2008 Gerard J. Foschini
2009 Robert McEliece
2010 John Cioffi
2011 Arogyaswami Paulraj
2012 Leonard Kleinrock
2013 Andrew Chraplyvy, Robert Tkach
2014 Dariush Divsalar
2015 Frank Kelly
2016 Roberto Padovani
2017 H. Vincent Poor
2018 Nambirajan Seshadri
2019 Teresa H. Meng
2020 Rajiv Laroia
2021 Nick McKeown
2022 Panganamala R. Kumar

See also 

 Alexander Graham Bell honors and tributes
 IEEE Medal of Honor
 IEEE awards
 World Communication Awards

References 

 

Alexander Graham Bell Medal
Alexander Graham Bell

Telecommunications engineering